Like the River Loves the Sea is the seventh studio album by American folk musician Joan Shelley. It was released on August 30, 2019, by independent label No Quarter Records. The album received critical acclaim from critics, with many praising its calmness and depth.

Recording
The majority of the album was recorded in Reykjavik, Iceland, near the esteemed Iðnó cultural center, and produced in collaboration with English folk singer-songwriter James Elkington.

Critical reception

Like the River Loves the Sea received extensive praise from critics. The album has a Metacritic score of 83/100, based on 12 reviews, indicating "universal acclaim."

Track listing

References

External links
Like the River Loves the Sea on Bandcamp

Folk albums by American artists